Manuri is a village in the Punjab province of Pakistan. It is located at 30°45'0N 74°9'0E with an altitude of 179 metres (590 feet).

References

Villages in Punjab, Pakistan